The Exile is a 1922 Soviet Georgian romantic drama film directed by Vladimir Barsky, based on the novel by Alexander Kazbegi.

Cast
 Shalva Dadiani - Preceptor
 Giorgi Davitashvili - Onise
 Yelena Charskaya - Djatia
 M. Alibegova - Makvala
 Valerian Gunia - Father of Makvala
 Margarita Barskaya - Mother of Makvala
 Aleksandre Imedashvili - Gela, husband of Makvala
 Iuza Zardalashvili

External links

1922 films
Kartuli Pilmi films
Soviet black-and-white films
Soviet silent feature films
Films based on Georgian novels
Soviet-era films from Georgia (country)
Soviet romantic drama films
1922 romantic drama films
Drama films from Georgia (country)
Silent feature films from Georgia (country)
Black-and-white films from Georgia (country)
Silent romantic drama films